Babu Rajab Ali (also known as Babu Ji) was a noted Kavishar of Punjab, known as the King of Kavishari.

Kavishar and kavishari 

Kavishari, or Kavishri, was originated in the Malwa region of Punjab. In the region a "Chhand-Baddh" kavita (poetry) is sung faster in a loud yet stretched voice without any musical instruments known as kavishari.

The people who write and sing kavishari are known as kavishars. Kavishari is usually sung during melas, weddings,  (religious concerts), mehfils and other celebrations.

Early life and career 
Babu Rajab Ali was born as Rajab Ali Khan on 10 August 1894 in a Muslim Rajputs family to father Mian Dhamaali Khan and mother Jiooni in the village of Sahoke of Firozpur district (now Moga district) in Punjab Province (British India). He had four sisters and one younger brother. His uncle Haji Ratan was a talented Kavishar as well.

He had his primary schooling from a neighbouring village of Banbiha, then high schooling in Moga and passed matriculation in 1912 from Barjindra High School, Faridkot. He was a good athlete and football player. He was the captain of the cricket team of his school. Later on he graduated with diploma in civil engineering, commonly known as Overseeri in Punjab those days, from an engineering school in Gujrat district. He worked as an overseer in Irrigation department. His first appointment as an Overseer was in Peshawar Tehsil (Pakistan).He also worked as an Overseer in village Akhara, Tehsil Jagraon (Ludhiana) at Canal Rest House Akhara (ref: an article by Labh Singh Sandhu in the leading newspaper "Punjabi Tribune" on 10 August 2012).

He was married to Bhago Begum, Rehmat Bibi, Fatima and Daulat Bibi and had – four sons Akaal Khan, Shamsher Khan, Adaalat Khan & Ali Sardar and two daughters Shamshad Begum & Gulzar Begum.

Babu Ji entered the world of Kavishari with his first poem Heer Babu Rajab Ali.

He could not compromise with his love for singing and left his job in 1940.

Life in Pakistan 
In 1947, after the independence, he had to leave his beloved village of Sahoke, his admirers, his students and his family history of hundred years and migrated to Pakistan.
His family got some land allotted in Chak no. 32/2 Okara district of West Punjab and settled there, but his soul always wandered in Malwa. He was madly in love with Malwa and his beloved Punjabi language and wrote hundreds of poems on his separation from his beloved people and village.

He visited the East Punjab in the March 1965. Thousands of people including Kavishars, admirers and his students came to see their beloved Babu Ji.

Babu Ji died on 6 June 1979, singing songs and longing to see his beloved people and village again.

Poems and literary work 
Although, he was fluent in Punjabi and Urdu and knew some of Persian, Arabic and English, his poetry only in Punjabi expressing his love for Punjab and Punjabi. His love for Punjab and Punjabi was unconditional and was not bound by walls of religion or nationality.

He wrote about one dozen Qissas and poems about the Hindu mythology like Ramayana, Puran Bhagat and Kaulan, Muslim heroes and historic figures like Muhammad, Hassan, Hussain and Dahood Badshah, and Sikh history and heroes like Bhagat Singh, Shaheedi Guru Arjun Dev Ji, Saka Sirhind, Saka Chamkaur and Bidhi Chand.

He wrote an episode or long poem about every know Punjabi folklore like Heer Ranjha, Mirza Sahiban, Dulla Bhatti and Sohni Mahiwal. He had many students who learnt from him and still sings his poetry including hundreds of other Kavishars in Punjab.

He gave some new Chhands like Bahattar Kala Chhand to Punjabi literature. 2000 poems on Sikhism

Books of Babu Ji 
Kavishar Sukhwinder Singh (Pakka Kalan) has published many books on Babu Ji through Sangam Publication, Samana. Some of them are :-
 Albela Rajab Ali
 Anmol Rajab Ali
 Ankhila Rajab Ali
 Anokha Rajab Ali
 Babu Rajab Ali De Kisse
 Dasmesh Mahima
 Rangila Rajab Ali

Other kavishars of Punjab 

Bapu Bali Singh is considered to be the father of the kavishari of Majha. Joga Singh Jogi is one of the most famous kavishars of Majha.
Bhai Maghi Singh Gill is another kavishar from Gill khurd village district Bathinda who worked very closely with Babu Rajab Ali Khan.

See also 
 Kavishari
 Kali (chhand)
 Karnail Singh Paras
 Kuldeep Manak
 Music of Punjab
 Punjabi folk music

References 

Kavishars
Punjabi people
Punjabi-language singers
Punjabi-language lyricists
1894 births
1979 deaths
20th-century Indian male singers
20th-century Indian singers